William IV (Guillaume Alexander; French: Guillaume Alexandre; 22 April 1852 – 25 February 1912) reigned as the Grand Duke of Luxembourg from 17 November 1905 until his death. He succeeded his father, Adolphe.

William was a Protestant, the religion of the House of Nassau.  He married Princess Marie Anne of Portugal, believing that a Roman Catholic country ought to have a Roman Catholic monarch. Thus his heirs have been Catholic.

At the death of his uncle, Prince Nikolaus-Wilhelm in 1905, the only other legitimate male in the House of Nassau-Weilburg was William's cousin, Georg Nikolaus, Count of Merenberg, the product of a morganatic marriage. So in 1907, William declared the Counts of Merenberg non-dynastic, naming his own eldest daughter Marie-Adélaïde (1894–1924) as heir presumptive to the grand ducal throne. She became Luxembourg's first reigning grand duchess upon her father's death in 1912, and upon her own abdication in 1919, was succeeded by her younger sister Charlotte (1896–1985). Charlotte's descendants reign until the present day.

To date, William is the last monarch of Luxembourg to die on the throne.

Marriage
On 21 June 1893 in Fischhorn Castle, Zell am See, he married Infanta Marie Anne of Portugal, daughter of former King Miguel I of Portugal and Princess Adelaide of Löwenstein-Wertheim-Rosenberg. The couple had six daughters:

Issue
 Marie-Adélaïde, Grand Duchess of Luxembourg (1894–1924) who remained unmarried and childless
 Charlotte, Grand Duchess of Luxembourg (1896–1985) who married her first cousin Prince Felix of Bourbon-Parma, a son of Marie Anne's younger sister.
 Princess Hilda (15 February 1897 in Berg Castle – 8 September 1979 in Berg Castle), married in Berg Castle on 29 October 1930 Adolf 10th Prince of Schwarzenberg (18 August 1890 in Frauenberg – 27 February 1950 in Bordighera), without issue
 Princess Antonia (1899–1954), who married Rupprecht, Crown Prince of Bavaria as his second wife
 Princess Elisabeth (7 March 1901 in Luxembourg – 2 August 1950 in Schloss Hohenburg), married in Schloss Hohenburg on 14 November 1922 Prince Ludwig Philipp of Thurn and Taxis (2 February 1901 in Regensburg – 22 April 1933 in Schloss Niederaichbach), son of Albert I, Prince of Thurn and Taxis, and had issue
 Princess Sophie (14 February 1902 in Berg Castle – 24 May 1941 in Munich), married at Schloss Hohenburg on 12 April 1921 Prince Ernst Heinrich of Saxony (9 December 1896 in Dresden – 14 June 1971 in Neckarhausen), youngest son of king Frederick Augustus III of Saxony, and had issue

Titles and honours

Titles and styles
Although the duchy of Nassau was annexed by Prussia after the Austro-Prussian war of 1866, the title of Duke of Nassau was retained by William and his heirs.

Foreign honours
  Duchy of Anhalt: Grand Cross of Albert the Bear, 1868
 : Grand Cross of St. Stephen, 1890
 :
 Knight of the House Order of Fidelity, 1885
 Knight of the Order of Berthold the First, 1885
 : Knight of St. Hubert, 1892
 : Grand Cross of Henry the Lion, 1873
 : Knight of the Elephant, 23 April 1876
 : Grand Cross of the Netherlands Lion
  Kingdom of Prussia: Knight of the Black Eagle, 14 December 1890
 : Grand Cross of the White Falcon, 1890
   Sweden-Norway:
 Knight of the Seraphim, 19 June 1889
 Grand Cross of St. Olav, 27 September 1897

Ancestry

Notes and references

External links
 Grand-Ducal House of Luxembourg

House of Nassau-Weilburg
Grand Dukes of Luxembourg
Members of the Council of State of Luxembourg
William IV of Luxembourg
Luxembourgian Protestants
Luxembourg, William IV of
Luxembourg, William IV of
People from Wiesbaden
Burials in the Royal Crypt of Weilburg Schlosskirche
Grand Crosses of the Order of Saint Stephen of Hungary